Delta Squadron is a 1983 video game published by Nexa Corporation.

Gameplay
Delta Squadron is a game in which the player is the Squadron Commander of the Legion Alliance who is directing small space fighter craft to destroy the Main Power Induction Inverter of the enemy Cetusites.

Reception
James A. McPherson reviewed the game for Computer Gaming World, and stated that "Delta Squadron is a strategic space war game for those people who are tired of the text and colored-grid games."

References

External links
Review in Softalk
Review in Electronic Games

1983 video games
Apple II games
Apple II-only games
Computer wargames
Space combat simulators
Turn-based strategy video games
Video games developed in the United States
Video games set in outer space